SunRice is the consumer brand and trading name of Ricegrowers Limited, which is one of the largest rice food companies in the world and one of Australia's leading branded food exporters. In the 2022 Financial Year, the company recorded revenue of A$1.3 billion and Net Profit After Tax of A$48.7 million.

The SunRice Group comprises multiple businesses, assets and operations across Australia, New Zealand, the Middle East, the United States, the Pacific Islands and Asia. It has around 35 major brands in approximately 50 global markets and employs over 2,000 people.

Australian rice production is based in regional southern New South Wales. The company's head office is located in Leeton (with a corporate office also in Sydney), and it has rice mills in Leeton, Deniliquin, and Coleambally. SunRice also operates stockfeed plants in Leeton, Tongala and Cobden.

In 2014, SunRice expanded to North Queensland with the purchase of the rice mill in Brandon, having recognised the region as an opportunity to grow specialty rice varieties to complement its existing supply of rice from the Riverina region in New South Wales.

In 2020, the SunRice Group celebrated its 70th anniversary. In the same year, its CopRice business converted the Coleambally Mill into a ruminant feed mill, the largest of its kind in Australia.

Today, the SunRice Group has operations across Australia, the USA, Singapore, United Arab Emirates, New Zealand, Solomon Islands, Japan, Jordan, Vietnam and Papua New Guinea.

Products 
SunRice manufactures more than 700 products - from table rice and rice flour, snacks and rice meals, to companion animal and livestock products

Around 80% of the Australian crop is exported as branded product in an average year to key markets including Asia, the Pacific and the Middle East.

During the 2017 financial year, the Company experienced significant market share growth in the domestic Australian snack foods sector due to increasing sales of microwave rice meals.

To complement its Australian operations to ensure reliability of supply in low crop years, while enabling Riverina growers to focus on premium varieties that provide higher farm-gate returns, SunRice is establishing sustainable and secure global sourcing and supply chains. In 2016/17, SunRice sourced 320,000 paddy tonnes from Vietnam and has opened a representative office in the country.

Business units and brands

CopRice 
CopRice has been supplying animal feed for over 30 years through its plants in Leeton, Tongala and Cobden. The CopRice business was originally established in response to the availability of rice by-products, such as rice pollard: a feed which is high in energy and protein. Rice now represents only one of the many ingredients used by CopRice. CopRice also operates a pet food business.

Riviana Foods 
Riviana Foods is a gourmet food distribution, sales and marketing company owned by SunRice. It has the largest share of olives and pickled vegetables in the retail channel in Australia. In its grocery business, important brands include Always Fresh, Felhbergs, Admiral, Captain, Riviana and Mahatma. Riviana Foods also has a strong presence in the food service sector and an extensive portfolio of brands including Riviana, Menu Master, Garden Supreme and Ocean Supreme.

Trukai Industries
Trukai is a rice product packaging, distribution, sales and marketing company that is two-thirds owned by SunRice, with the remaining interest held by the people of Papua New Guinea (PNG) through the Pacific Balanced Fund.

Registered in 1970 by SunRice, Trukai has a number of well-established brands including Trukai and Roots Rice. Trukai's head office and processing base is located in Lae, with a marketing office in Port Moresby and distribution facilities located throughout Papua New Guinea. Trukai employs over 1,000 people throughout the country.

SolRice 
Solrice, located in the Solomon Islands, is a distribution, sales and marketing company wholly owned by SunRice.

SunFoods 
SunFoods is a rice milling, distribution and marketing company that was established in 2008 and now owned by SunRice. SunFoods is the owner of the Hinode brand, which was created by the California-based Rice Growers Association in the 1930s. The  Hinode brand is very strong in medium-grain rice markets throughout the US, and is stocked in retail outlets including Walmart, WinCo Foods Stores and Kruger. SunFoods’ head office and milling base is located in Woodlands, California.

AGS 
SunRice's wholly owned subsidiary AGS owns and operates Riverina-based grain storage infrastructure with capacity exceeding 1 million tonnes.

RRAPL 
Rice Research Australia Pty Ltd (RRAPL), a wholly owned subsidiary of SunRice, undertakes rice varietal and agronomic research and development in partnership with the NSW Department of Primary Industries and the Rural Industries Research and Development Corporation (RIRDC). RRAPL operates a leased farm in the Riverina for its activities.

Corporate activity 
In July 2014, SunRice announced the acquisition of the rice milling assets of the Blue Ribbon Rice Group. The assets, located in North Queensland's Burdekin region, include property, plant and equipment.

SunRice is committed to building a sustainable Queensland rice industry, investing significantly to improve the quality of locally grown rice and manufacturing productivity at the Brandon Mill. Key developments have seen a weighbridge installed to enable growers to directly deliver paddy to the mill. A new software system is also being investigated to improve the management of incoming and outgoing rice stocks. SunRice has also expanded the rice storage capacity at the Brandon Mill, with the purchase of 40 hectares of land adjacent to the Mill, where new storage facilities have been built to supplement the Mill's recently commissioned grain drying equipment. The new facility includes 18 new paddy drying silos with 4,000 tonne capacity to complement the Mill's existing 1,500 tonnes of storage.

SunRice and RRAPL, in conjunction with the Federal Government, Rural Industries Research and Development Corporation (RIRDC) and other private and state-based organisations and universities, are progressing preparations for rolling out the program of activity for the Government's $4 million Rural R&D for Profit grant announced last year to support the North Queensland rice industry.

References

Privately held companies of Australia
Food and drink companies established in 1950
Rice organizations
Riverina
Agriculture companies of Australia
Australian companies established in 1950
Companies based in New South Wales